= Kurdikeri =

Coordinates: 15°13′N 75°06′E

Kurdikeri Holaluru
- Village
- Interactive map of Kurdikeri
- Country: India
- Karnataka State: Karnataka
- District: Dharwad

Government
  - Body: Village Panchayat

Population (2011)
  - Total: 2,452

Languages
  - Official: Kannada
- Time zone: UTC+5:30 (IST)
- ISO 3166 code: IN-KA
- Vehicle registration: KA_25/63
- Website: karnataka.gov.in

Kurdikeri is a village in Dharwad district of Karnataka, India.

== Demographics ==
As of the 2011 Census of India there were 512 households in Kurdikeri and a total population of 2,452 consisting of 1,236 males and 1,216 females. There were 351 children ages 0–6.
